The Grundy NewBrain was a microcomputer sold in the early 1980s by Grundy Business Systems Ltd of Teddington and Cambridge, England.

Beginnings 

The NewBrain project was started in 1978 when Sinclair Radionics began design work with Mike Wakefield as the designer and Basil Smith as the software engineer. This project was intended to provide competition for Apple and hardly fitted in with Sinclair's focus on inexpensive consumer-oriented products. When it became obvious to Sinclair that the NewBrain could not be made for the sub-£100 price he envisaged, his thoughts turned to the ZX80 that was to be developed by his other company, Science of Cambridge Ltd.

The NewBrain project was moved to Newbury Laboratories by the National Enterprise Board (NEB), the owner of both Sinclair Radionics and Newbury Labs, following the closure of Sinclair Radionics. In 1980, Newbury announced the imminent release of three NewBrain models, including a battery-powered portable computer.

BBC micro project 

In early 1980, the British Broadcasting Corporation (BBC) Further Education department conceived the idea of a computer literacy programme, principally in response to the impact of a 1979 six-part ITV documentary series, The Mighty Micro, in which Dr Christopher Evans from the UK National Physical Laboratory predicted the coming (micro) computer revolution. It was a very influential documentary — so much so that questions were asked in parliament. BBC Engineering was instructed to attempt to draw up an objective specification.

As a result of the questions in Parliament, the Department of Industry (DoI) became interested in the programme, as did BBC Enterprises, which saw an opportunity to sell a machine to go with the series. 

Eventually, under some pressure from the DoI to choose a British system, the BBC 'chose' the NewBrain. The BBC specification was closely written around the NewBrain specification, with (presumably) the expectation that Newbury Laboratories would tender and win. It was not to be. Although the NewBrain was under heavy development by Newbury, it soon became clear that Newbury was not going to be able to produce it. Newbury did not tender, thus opening the door for other companies.
The BBC's programmes, initially scheduled for Autumn 1981, were moved back to Spring 1982. 
After Chris Curry and Clive Sinclair found out about the BBC's plans, the BBC allowed other manufacturers to submit their proposals. Chris Curry visited the BBC and persuaded them to change the specification so that Acorn could submit their design.

The BBC eventually chose a computer from Acorn Computers Ltd.

As a result of the BBC's decision, the British Technology Group, which had replaced the NEB, sold the final design and production to Grundy. Grundy had been looking for an entrant into the personal computer business, as they were already producing a CP/M 2.2-based machine, built into a 'dumb terminal' as a virtual clone of the Intertec Superbrain.

Models 

Two main models were released. The model 'A' needed to display on either a TV or a monitor. The model 'AD' also included a one-line, 16-character, vacuum fluorescent (VF) display on the unit which permitted operation with or without a TV screen or monitor — the VF display responded to the cursor keys and scrolled around the screen display area. One additional model was released, but this was a custom version for a pharmaceutical chain, with no screen display — only the VF display — and was not widely known.

An expansion chassis was released, providing an additional 64 kB of paged memory. Since the Z80 has a 16-bit address bus, it can only address 64 kB of memory at a time. The paged memory system in the expansion chassis used bank switching to allow the NewBrain to take advantage of several 64 kB modules. The expansion module included a parallel printer port and two hardware based serial ports and an expansion bus to connect further modules such as the 8 and 16 way serial modules under development. The expansion module included Series 2 software, replacing those in the processor module as well as software for the new devices. 

CP/M 2.2 was also available. Under CP/M 2.2 the internal BASIC ROM was paged out for the CP/M ROM but this gave only 32 kB memory to CP/M. With the expansion module fitted the three 8 kB ROMs of the processor module were paged out to give the NewBrain one of the highest available TPA (Transient Program Area — memory left after the OS demands are satisfied) to CP/M. Grundy Business Systems released two 5.25" drive formats, 40 track 200 kB single sided and 80 track 800 kB double sided. Several independent dealers provided 40 track 400 kB double sided drive. In 1983 the Sony 3.5"  became available and single and paired units were supplied to dealers in the NewBrain cream cases. The 3.5" 800 kB discs also got a more effective format allowing the files from 4x200 kB floppies to be stored on one 800 kB disc.

Commercial application 
Over 50,000 NewBrain units were sold to educational, scientific, industry, small business and banking sectors; as well as to home users. Scientific use was strong because of the unusually high precision of the NewBrain's floating point computations and its very high-resolution graphics. Business use was also proportionally high due to the availability of CP/M based software. The main industrial use was within the pharmaceutical industry. The computer was widely used by the Angolan Government; the central planning of the Angolan Ministry of Commerce in 1981 - 1984 were made using this machine instead of much more expensive computers.

Software 

The unexpanded NewBrain contains software provided in ROM, primarily BASIC, a full screen editor and device drivers. Other packages were also included within the ROM (e.g. maths and graphics packages) and were accessible to BASIC and any other software.

All I/O was stream-based, and orthogonal: any device could be replaced by an alternative, although the manual did warn that devices had to be chosen with care. This approach did make it easy to write programs that could swap between input and output coming from a screen, keyboard or tape. 

The maths package had 12 figures of accuracy and a dynamic range of 10−150 to 10150, compared to most common machines having 6 figure accuracy and a dynamic range of 10−38 to 10+38. This was achieved by using base 256 for the floating point format, rather than the more common base 2, and using six bytes for storing numbers, rather than the more common four. Five bytes stored the basic number, with the last byte storing the sign in the first bit, and the remaining seven bits storing the exponent. For example, π was stored as 3.14159265358.

Benchmarks show that even though the NewBrain performed double accuracy calculations, it was one of the fastest 8-bit computers available for several years, completing PCW Benchmark 8 in 7.0 seconds. For comparison against other contemporary machines, the Sinclair Spectrum took 25.3 seconds, the BBC Micro took 5.1 seconds, but with fewer significant digits. The 16-bit IBM PC took 3.5 seconds.

The graphics screen was separate from the text screen and was opened as a new output stream that shared space with the text screen. The graphics commands were based on 'turtle' keywords and provided a flexible means of drawing. The last two generations of NewBrain ROMs included additional graphics commands — ROM 1.9 had two more commands, and ROM 2.0 some more. But to ensure compatibility little software would use these additional commands. The programmers were working on version 2.2 as well as versions for different keyboards, including Greek and Swedish as well as French and German. Grundy had been considering offering the Series 2 ROMs to existing users. This required the existing soldered in ROMs to be removed from the circuit board and a socket soldered in. The tight fit and labour cost was high on this retrofitting, and the failure of the company in 1983 meant that users were never aware that this was being considered.

The version of BASIC was an extended version of ANSI BASIC, the facilities of which were similar to those in  Microsoft BASIC. The graphics package included commands that could draw dots, lines, arcs, filled-in areas and annotated axes.

Grundy offered a 'Software Technical Manual'. This manual documented various routines that could be called in the ROM and the calling parameters. It was left to the NewBrain user groups to publish the details of how to access these routines through the indirect call. (A low-memory address was called with the relevant routine parameters, and this address would call the ROM-specific location of a jump table which, in turn, then called the final routine.) Even screen access required this indirect use, as the screen location would change as new input and output streams were created, including high-resolution (for the time) graphic streams. Memory maps and other technical information were included in numerous technical notes which were supplied to dealers and owners free of charge. The Technical Manual had a retail price of £50.

HiSoft produced NewBrain versions of their Pascal compiler and editor. A number of CP/M applications were converted to using the NewBrain's CP/M terminal and made available on NewBrain 5.25" and 3.5" formatted diskettes. These included Z80 Assemblers and debuggers, Pro Pascal and Pro Fortran, TCL Pascal, dBase II, Wordstar 3.3, Peachtree Accounting applications, the Superfile database and CP/M versions of Hisoft Pascal, Modula-2, Z80 Assembler and text editor.

Many third party software houses (e.g. IEL, MicroMart, Black Knight Computers) provided independent software for the NewBrain, which was supplied to users such as the British Ministry of Defence, and Cambridge University.

Demise 

Tradecom purchased Grundy Business Systems in 1983 in order to fulfill a contract to supply microcomputers to schools and training centres in the Netherlands. They created a server to which several NewBrains could use its floppy discs to load programs down the serial cable and simple switching enabled the teacher to view the screen of the students. They also demonstrated a keyboard with predictive text laid out in a non-QWERTY fashion. They were given television coverage, but the NewBrain's part in this was not mentioned. Tradecom's NewBrains were supplied entirely by existing stock. A press release was made of a new factory in India to provide NewBrains for the Indian market and to supply Europe, but nothing materialised.

Today 

The Dutch NewBrain user group has PDF downloads of various publications, and a link to a Greek website that contains a PC-based emulator. The Dutch website has many of the programs that were available for the NewBrain, and these can be run on the emulator.

References

 NewBrain Handbook
 NewBrain Model AD, Serial # 610802
 Personal Computer World, 1982 review.
 The Computer Programme, BBC Television.
 NBUG magazines

External links

Z80-based home computers
Home computers
Computers designed in the United Kingdom
Portable computers
Early microcomputers